William Cooper Gregory (1895 – 23 October 1970) was a New Zealand politician who was the Mayor of Lower Hutt from 1949 to 1950.

Biography
He was born in County Wicklow, Ireland and served three years in France during World War I. After the war he emigrated to New Zealand where he had several vocations after arriving in farming, the timber trade and auctioneering. He later became the director of a building and farming supplies company before being employed as the managing director of Montgomery's Furnishings Store in Levin. He moved to Lower Hutt in 1930 and stated his own real estate business; W Gregory & Co Ltd. In 1941 he married Anne Dunlop.

He was elected a member of the Lower Hutt Borough Council on a Citizens' Association ticket from 1938 to 1949. In June 1947 the mayor, Jack Andrews, resigned and the councillors elected deputy mayor Ernst Peterson Hay as his replacement for the remainder of the term until the scheduled election in November. At the same meeting Gregory was selected unanimously to replace Hay as deputy mayor. When Hay resigned mid-term in January 1949 Gregory was elected mayor in March 1949 at a by-election. At the November 1950 election Gregory was defeated for the mayoralty by Labour Party councillor Percy Dowse.

He retained an interest in civic affairs and in 1951 he was one of the objectors to the proposal of the new Labour majority council to relieve High Street congestion by putting a new road through Riddiford Park, linking Barraud Street (then a cul-de-sac) to Kings Crescent. The alternative was a road alongside the stop bank which the City Engineer said was too expensive and of dubious value. The Barraud Street extension (now Queen's Drive) required moving forty houses from north of Laings Road, and according to Gregory: "Riddiford Park was one of the most beautiful spots in New Zealand, and its whole character would change if a road was put through it" Five councillors voted against the road, but it went through after an empowering act was passed by Parliament.

At the 1953 local elections he declined to seek the mayoralty again but stood for a council seat. However, he was defeated (alongside all other Citizens' candidates).

Notes

References 

"Former Hutt Mayor dies last night", Evening Post of 22 October 1970. 

1896 births
1970 deaths
People from County Wicklow
Irish emigrants to New Zealand
Mayors of Lower Hutt
20th-century New Zealand politicians
Hutt City Councillors
New Zealand military personnel of World War I